Joemma Beach State Park is a  Washington state park on Puget Sound in Pierce County. The park offers  of saltwater shoreline on southeast Key Peninsula and opportunities for picnicking, camping, boating, fishing, waterskiing, crabbing, and beachcombing.

References

External links
Joemma Beach State Park Washington State Parks and Recreation Commission 
Joemma Beach State Park Map Washington State Parks and Recreation Commission

State parks of Washington (state)
Parks in Pierce County, Washington